Spirit Lake Municipal Airport  is a county-owned public-use airport located in Okoboji, Iowa, United States.

Facilities and aircraft 
For the 12-month period ending June 12, 2012, the airport had 4,200 aircraft operations. There are 12 aircraft based at this airport: 11 single-engine and 1 multi-engine.

References

External links

Airports in Iowa
Transportation buildings and structures in Dickinson County, Iowa